Bruce Edwards (November 16, 1954 – April 8, 2004) was a long-time caddie for Hall of Fame golfer Tom Watson.

Edwards began caddying for Watson in 1973 and worked with him until 1989. Edwards left to assist Greg Norman but returned to Watson's side in 1992 and stayed until 2003.  That year, he was diagnosed with amyotrophic lateral sclerosis (commonly known as Lou Gehrig's disease) but continued to caddie for Watson until the strain became too much.

His life is chronicled in Caddy For Life: The Bruce Edwards Story written by his biographer John Feinstein.

At the age of 49, Edwards succumbed to ALS at his home in Ponte Vedra Beach, Florida.

See also
 Caddie Hall of Fame

External links 
BBC obituary
The Globe and Mail obituary
Caddy For Life by John Feinstein
Bruce Edwards Foundation Website

American caddies
Deaths from motor neuron disease
Neurological disease deaths in Florida
1954 births
2004 deaths